The Briggs Family is a 1940 British drama film directed by Herbert Mason and starring Edward Chapman, Felix Aylmer, Jane Baxter, Oliver Wakefield and Austin Trevor. During the Second World War, a special constable and former solicitor is called upon to defend his son who is accused of the theft of a car.

Cast

 Edward Chapman as Charley Briggs
 Jane Baxter as Sylvia Briggs
 Oliver Wakefield as Ronnie Perch
 Austin Trevor as John Smith
 Mary Clare as Mrs Briggs
 Peter Croft as Bob Briggs
 Glynis Johns as Shelia Briggs
 Lesley Brook as Alice
 Felix Aylmer as Mr Sand
 Jack Melford as Jerry Tulse
 George Carney as George Downing
 Muriel George as Mrs Brokenshaw
 Aubrey Mallalieu as Milward
 Esma Cannon as Myrtle 
 Joss Ambler as Prosecutor
 Kitty de Legh as Mary Grayson
 Ian Fleming as Air Vice Marshal
 Vincent Holman as Inspector 
 Hamilton Keene as Detective Sergeant Harper
 Pat McGrath as Herbert Lane
 Wilfrid Hyde-White as Man with Moustache at party (uncredited)

Sequels

Due to the criticism of the characters not being true to life plans to make further sequels and a series of 'Briggs' films were dropped.

References

Bibliography

Quinlan, David. (1984). British Sound Films: The Studio Years 1928-1959. BT Batsford Ltd

External links
 
 

1940 films
1940s English-language films
1940 crime drama films
Films directed by Herbert Mason
British black-and-white films
British crime drama films
1940s British films